Tautenburg is a municipality in the district Saale-Holzland, in Thuringia, Germany. It is home to the Karl Schwarzschild Observatory.

References

Municipalities in Thuringia
Saale-Holzland-Kreis